Kamratposten, also styled as KP, (Swedish: Pal Paper) is a Swedish children's magazine published in Stockholm, Sweden. Founded in 1892 it is one of the earliest children's magazines in the country.

History and profile
The magazine was established by Stina Quint in 1892 under the name Folkskolans barntidning (Swedish: Elementary Schoolchild's Magazine). It was published with that name until 1950. The magazine has been part of the Bonnier Group since its start in 1892. The publisher is Bonnier Tidskrifter based in Stockholm. It targets children between 8 and 14 years old.

The editor-in-chief of KP is Lukas Björkman. Ola Lindholm also served in the post until September 2011 when he left the post due to his involvement in the cocaine use case.

The website of KP was launched on 1 September 2007. As of 2012 the magazine was published once or twice per month.

References

External links

Official website

1892 establishments in Sweden
Biweekly magazines published in Sweden
Bonnier Group
Children's magazines published in Sweden
Comics magazines published in Sweden
Magazines established in 1892
Magazines published in Stockholm
Monthly magazines published in Sweden
Swedish-language magazines
Irregularly published magazines